The Czech Republic men's national under-18 ice hockey team is the men's national under-18 ice hockey team of the Czech Republic. The team is controlled by the Czech Ice Hockey Association, a member of the International Ice Hockey Federation. The team represents the Czech Republic at the IIHF World U18 Championships.

International competitions

IIHF European U18 Championships
  

1993:  3rd place
1994:  3rd place
1995: 5th place

1996: 5th place
1997: 5th place
1998: 4th place

IIHF World U18 Championships

1999: 5th place
2000: 6th place
2001: 4th place
2002:  3rd place
2003: 6th place
2004:  3rd place
2005: 4th place
2006:  3rd place
2007: 9th place
2008: 1st in Division I Group A
2009: 6th place
2010: 6th place

2011: 8th place
2012: 8th place
2013: 7th place
2014:  2nd place
2015: 6th place
2016: 7th place
2017: 7th place
2018: 4th place
2019: 6th place
2020: Cancelled due to the COVID-19 pandemic
2021: 7th place
2022: 4th place

External links
 Team Czech Republic all time scoring leaders in IIHF U18 World Championships
Czech Republic at IIHF.com

under-18
National under-18 ice hockey teams
Youth ice hockey in the Czech Republic